Erysimaga is a genus of moths belonging to the family Tineidae. It contains only one species, Erysimaga chlororrhabda, which is found in Papua New Guinea.

References

Tineidae
Monotypic moth genera
Moths of Oceania
Tineidae genera
Taxa named by Edward Meyrick